Noccaeopsis is a monotypic genus of flowering plants in the family Brassicaceae. It is endemic to Eastern Russia.

Taxonomy 
The genus was first described by F.K.Mey. in 2010.

Description 
It is a genus with the only species being Noccaeopsis kamtschatica.

References 

Brassicaceae
Monotypic Brassicaceae genera
Plants described in 2010
Flora of Russia